Mayor's Cup may refer to:

 Guyana Mayors Cup, the top knockout tournament of the Guyana football
 Mayor's Cup (Missouri–South Carolina), a traveling trophy awarded to the winner of the Missouri and South Carolina college football game
 Mayor's Cup, a traveling trophy awarded to the winner of the Rensselaer and Union college ice hockey game
 Mayor's Cup, a traveling trophy awarded to the winner of the Brown and Providence college ice hockey game
 Mayor's Cup, a traveling trophy awarded to the winner of the New Mexico State and UTEP football game known as the Battle of I-10
 Mayor's Cup, a traveling trophy awarded to the winner of the Oral Roberts–Tulsa basketball rivalry
 Mayor's Cup, a traveling trophy awarded to the winner of the Rice–SMU football rivalry
 Mayor's Cup (Temple–Villanova), a traveling trophy awarded to the winner of the football game between Temple University and Villanova University
 Osaka Mayor's Cup, an annually held ITF Grade A junior tennis tournament
 Rowdies Cup, formerly Mayor's Cup, a traveling trophy awarded to the winner of the college soccer game between USF Bulls and Tampa Spartans